Ammar Manaf Ramadan (born 5 January 2001) is a Syrian professional footballer who plays as an attacking midfielder for FC DAC 1904 Dunajská Streda in Slovak Fortuna League.

Club career

Youth clubs in Italy
Ramadan left Syria for Italy in October 2015, where he initially joined Cimiano Calcio, then he played for Juventus's youth team from 2016 to 2019.

Ferencváros
In January 2019, he joined Hungarian side Ferencváros. On 23 June 2020, Ramadan played his first professional match for Ferencváros in a 1–0 defeat against Fehérvár. He later won the 2019–20 Nemzeti Bajnokság I with Ferencváros.

DAC Dunajská Streda
After spending the summer break with DAC Dunajská Streda, Ramadan signed with the club on 22 July 2022 after impressing the staff led by Adrián Guľa.

Personal life
Ramadan's father, Munaf, was also a footballer.

Career statistics

Honours
Ferencváros
 Nemzeti Bajnokság I: 2019–20

Spartak Trnava
Slovak Cup: 2021–22

References

External links
 
 

2001 births
Living people
People from Jableh
Syrian footballers
Syrian expatriate footballers
Association football midfielders
Ferencvárosi TC footballers
Soroksár SC players
FC Spartak Trnava players
FC DAC 1904 Dunajská Streda players
Nemzeti Bajnokság I players
Nemzeti Bajnokság II players
Slovak Super Liga players
Expatriate footballers in Hungary
Syrian expatriate sportspeople in Hungary
Expatriate footballers in Slovakia
Syrian expatriate sportspeople in Slovakia